The Dukes was a 30-minute Saturday morning animated series based on the live-action television series The Dukes of Hazzard which aired on CBS from February 5 to October 29, 1983. Hanna-Barbera Productions produced the series in association with Warner Bros. Television, producer of the original series. 20 episodes were produced.

Plot
The series features the Duke boys and their cousin Daisy in an automobile race around the world against Boss Hogg, Sheriff Rosco P. Coltrane, and Rosco's dog Flash in a duel for the prize money which the Dukes hope to use to keep the family farm from being foreclosed by Boss Hogg. Actually, Boss Hogg wants the money and the land for himself so he, Rosco, and Flash plans various schemes to keep the Dukes from winning. Most of the adventures are read from a post card by Uncle Jesse Duke to his pet raccoon Smokey.

The first season took place during the period of the live-action series' temporary replacement of the original actors with similar characters, Coy and Vance Duke, after Tom Wopat and John Schneider walked out over a dispute about royalties from related merchandise. Thus, the first season of this animated series featured Coy and Vance. Bo and Luke eventually replaced Coy and Vance in Season 2 Episode 1 (14): "Boss O'Hogg and the Little People" after Tom and John simultaneously returned to the live series following the end of the dispute near the end of the fifth season. This episode also featured a new introduction and voice over that reflected the change in characters.

The series followed no particular logical geographic path; for instance, consecutive episodes feature appearances in Venice, Morocco, the Arctic Ocean, London, Greece, India, Uzbekistan, Hong Kong and Scotland.

Cast
 Byron Cherry as Coy Duke (first season)
 Christopher Mayer as Vance Duke (first season)
 Tom Wopat as Luke Duke (second season)
 John Schneider as Bo Duke (second season)
 Catherine Bach as Daisy Duke
 Denver Pyle as Uncle Jesse Duke
 James Best as Sheriff Rosco P. Coltrane
 Sorrell Booke as Boss Hogg
 Frank Welker as Flash, Smokey, The General Lee

Note: Live-action co-stars Waylon Jennings (narrator/"balladeer"), Ben Jones (Cooter Davenport), Sonny Shroyer (Deputy Enos Strate), and Rick Hurst (Deputy Cletus Hogg) did not appear in this cartoon version.

Additional voices
 Jack Angel
 Chris Anthony (Season 1)
 Jered Barclay (Season 1)
 Michael Bell (Season 1)
 Susan Blu (Season 2)
 Bill Callaway (Season 1)
 Rick Cimino (Season 2)
 Phil Clarke
 Peter Cullen (Season 1)
 Keene Curtis
 Jennifer Darling (Season 1)
 Dick Erdman
 Pat Fraley (Season 2)
 Linda Gary (Season 1)
 Joan Gerber (Season 1)
 Gary Goren (Season 2)
 Joy Gronic (Season 2)
 Ernest Harada (Season 1)
 Phil Hartman (Season 2)
 Bob Holt
 Arte Johnson (Season 2)
 Stanley Jones
 Paul Kirby
 Peter Leeds (Season 1)
 Sherry Lynn (Season 2)
 Ken Mars (Season 1)
 Edie McClurg (Season 1)
 Scott Menville (Season 1)
 Larry Moss (Season 1)
 Laurel Page (Season 1)
 Pat Pinney (Season 2)
 Henry Polic II (Season 1)
 Tony Pope (Season 1)
 Phil Proctor (Season 1)
 Bob Ridgely (Season 1)
 Neil Ross (Season 1)
 Mike Rye (Season 1)
 Marilyn Schreffler (Season 1)
 Hal Smith (Season 1)
 John Stephenson
 Janet Waldo (Season 2)
 Alan Young (Season 2)

Episodes

Season 1 (1983)

Season 2 (1983)
Starting in the very first episode of this season, Tom Wopat and John Schneider return as Luke and Bo in the regular Dukes of Hazzard series, and take over for Coy and Vance in the cartoon.

Home media
On December 7, 2010, Warner Archive released The Dukes: The Complete Series on DVD in region 1 as part of their Hanna-Barbera Classics Collection.

See also
 List of animated spin-offs from prime time shows

References

External links
 
 Big Cartoon Database
 Toon Tracker - Animated Versions of Prime-Time Series
 http://www.hazzardnet.com/TheDukes-animated-series

1980s American animated television series
CBS original programming
The Dukes of Hazzard
Animated television series about auto racing
1983 American television series debuts
1983 American television series endings
Television series by Hanna-Barbera
Television series by Warner Bros. Television Studios
English-language television shows
American children's animated comedy television series
American children's animated sports television series
American animated television spin-offs